Henry Sutherland Edwards (1828–1906) was a British journalist.

He was born in London, and educated in London and France.  He was correspondent of The Times at the coronation of Alexander II of Russia, in the camp of the insurgents at Warsaw (1862–63), and at German army headquarters during the Franco-Prussian War.

In 1865 he took over the role of chief music critic on The Morning Post from Howard Glover and he was a regular contributor to The Pall Mall Gazette.

Selected publications
The Russians at Home (1861)
The Polish Captivity: An Account of the Present Position of the Poles in the Kingdom of Poland, and in the Polish Provinces of Austria, Prussia, and Russia (1863)
The Life of Rossini (1869)
The Germans in France (1874)
The Russians at Home and the Russians Abroad (1879, Vol. 1 is an abridgment of the 1861 book Russians at Home. Vol. 2 deals with political issues.)
The Lyrical Drama: Essays on Subjects, Composers, & Executants of Modern Opera (1881)
The Case of Reuben Malachi (1886)
The Prima Donna: Her History and Surroundings from the Seventeenth to the Nineteenth Century (two volumes, 1888)
Rossini and His School (1895)
Personal Recollections (1900)

References

External links

 

1828 births
1906 deaths
British male journalists
British biographers
The Times people
Male biographers